Aeropacífico S.A. de C.V. is a Mexican regional airline founded in 2000, which offers scheduled and charter flights in the Mexican Northern Pacific region.

The Aeropacífico Fleet comprises 2 twin-engine turboprop aircraft with capacity for 19 passengers and 2 crews.

Destinations

Baja California Sur
SJD Los Cabos

Chihuahua
CUU Chihuahua

Sinaloa
CUL Culiacán
LMM Los Mochis

Sonora
HMO Hermosillo

Fleet
1 Let L-410
1 BAe Jetstream

External links
 Official Page.

Airlines established in 2000
Airlines of Pacific Mexico